Moyles Court School is a private, private school located in Rockford, Hampshire, for children aged 2 to 16 years. The Headmaster is Richard Milner-Smith (since 2014).

History 
The school started in the 1940s, in Bude, north Cornwall. It then moved to a manor house in Wimborne, Dorset briefly before the headteacher at the time, Vesper Hunter, oversaw the move to the current site in 1963. The main building at Moyles Court was the former manor house of Rockford, and later for Ellingham as well. The 17th century manor house was once the home of Dame Alice Lisle, the last lady to be publicly beheaded in England following a judicial trial. In 1940 Moyles Court was requisitioned by the RAF as the station Headquarters of the RAF Ibsley Airfield and derequisitioned in 1946. Whilst they resided here the officers clearly had time for recreation as they were known to have used the lawn for tennis.

In 1962, the  estate was sold at an auction advertised and conducted by Woolley and Wallis. Headteacher Vesper Hunter oversaw the move of the school here in 1962.

The school was bought in 2014 by Broadway Education.

The School 
The Early Years part of the school caters for ages 2–4 (Preschool and Year R), then the Junior School is for Years 1–6, and the Senior School for Years 7-11. The school also caters for boarders from Years 3-11.

Moyles Court is known for their holistic approach to teaching, and the use of the immediate environment (The New Forest) to capture the imagination of the children, as in 2019, when the school raised ponies before putting them out to graze on the forest in line with the school's Common rights.

The school is a member of the Independent Schools Council and of the Boarding Schools’ Association.

Moyles Court has enjoyed enviable GCSE results in the past, and continues to perform well.

Headteachers 
 Miss F. M. Wilde, 1940 - 1958 (founder of the school)
 Miss Vesper Hunter, 1958 - 1975 (oversaw the move to Moyles Court in 1963)
 Mr C. J. Bryon Edmond, 1975 - 1978
 Mr. G. H. L. Rimbault, 1978 - 1979
 Miss Betty Hall, 1979 - 1983
 Mrs. Diana Hitchcock, 1983 - 1988
 Mr. Anthony Coghill, 1988 - 1993 
 Mr. Richard Dean, 1993 - 2008
 Mr. Greg Meakin, 2008 - 2014 
 Mr. Richard Milner-Smith, 2014–Present

Inspection Reports 
The school has been inspected by the ISI (Independent Schools Inspectorate), and gained a ‘Good’ rating across the board in 2018.

References 

Private schools in Hampshire